The Gorlovsky Coal Mine is a coal mine located in Novosibirsk Oblast. The mine has coal reserves amounting to 5 billion tonnes of coking coal, one of the largest coal reserves in Russia and the world and has an annual production of 5 million tonnes of coal.

References 

Coal mines in Russia
Buildings and structures in Novosibirsk Oblast